Colonel Christopher Hilary Vernon is a British Army officer. In 2003, Colonel Vernon gained international attention as the senior spokesman for the British Landforces during the 2003 invasion of Iraq.

Vernon was commissioned into the Queen's Own Hussars (later Queen's Royal Hussars) from the Royal Military Academy Sandhurst in 1976.

Prior to serving in Iraq and Afghanistan, Colonel Vernon served in Bosnia in 1995.  During his time in Bosnia in 1995, he served as the spokesman for (UNPROFOR) under the command of General Sir Rupert Smith.

Most recently Vernon was Chief of Staff for NATO forces in southern Afghanistan.

References

Queen's Own Hussars officers
Queen's Royal Hussars officers
Graduates of the Royal Military Academy Sandhurst
Year of birth missing (living people)
Living people
British Army personnel of the Iraq War